Karl Erik Algot Almgren (28 January 1908 – 23 August 1989) was a Swedish footballer and football manager. He played for AIK. He played 13 times for the Swedish national team, participating at the 1938 FIFA World Cup. He was also part of Sweden's squad at the 1936 Summer Olympics, but he did not play in any matches.

He also had a career as a manager.

References

External links
Profile

1908 births
1989 deaths
Swedish footballers
Sweden international footballers
1938 FIFA World Cup players
AIK Fotboll players
Swedish football managers
AIK Fotboll managers
Åtvidabergs FF managers
Association football midfielders
Footballers from Stockholm